Sannakawa Dam is an earthfill dam located in Gunma Prefecture in Japan. The dam is used for irrigation. The catchment area of the dam is 67.3 km2. The dam impounds about 13  ha of land when full and can store 1426 thousand cubic meters of water. The construction of the dam was started on 1929 and completed in 1933.

References

Dams in Gunma Prefecture